Pub golf or bar golf is a recreational drinking game involving a selection of either nine or eighteen pubs (Public House/Bar), creating a "course" to be played by two or more people. It is essentially a pub crawl made into a game. Unlike the actual game of golf, pub golf involves no ball or fairway.

Rules
Like the game of golf, pub golf has the standard 9 or 18 different "holes", wherein each bar is considered a "hole". The bars to be visited during the game are predetermined and numbered. These numbers determine the order in which each bar will be visited. Prior to playing the game, a par number (ranging from 1 to 5) also needs to be determined for each bar. E.g. Hole "5" (at Pub #5)- Par 4= One pint of beer.

The par number represents how many drinks/sips/gulps it should take to complete the drink assigned. Therefore, in the example given, at hole 5, if the pint of beer is completed in 4 drinks, the person drinking that pint is awarded a par. However many drinks it takes to complete the assigned drink should be recorded on a scorecard. (Thus, 5 drinks @ Hole 5= +1 to your score).

The drinks assigned to the different "holes" (pubs) should vary, and should be reasonable when taking into account the par number (number of gulps it takes to finish). A simple shot, for example, should suffice for a par one.

A time limit for each hole must also be determined before the game is played. Thirty minutes is generally sufficient, but it can vary depending on your party size and focus.

There are many different variations of pub golf played, and some games add hazards to the course. E.g. Certain holes can be assigned as having a water hazard. This means that the restroom cannot be used while playing that hole, or else a penalty stroke is given.

Scoring
Scores are kept on individual score cards, and each person keeps track of how many drinks/sips/gulps taken to finish the assigned drink for that hole. If the number of drinks/sips/gulps is the same as the par number, then that participant receives a par for that hole. Assigned drinks can be finished with fewer or more drinks/sips/gulps than the par number assigned, and so a contestant will receive their hole score as such. The goal is similar to golf in that it is to end the game with the lowest score. Prizes are often awarded in the end as an incentive to strive for a lower score.

In the event of a tie, the winner shall be determined by an arm wrestle to be conducted on the footpath outside the final pub. 

Often the individual who comes last in pub golf is expected to do a forfeit. This makes the game more intense as it creates drama.  Participants obviously don't want to forfeit as it is often embarrassing. One of the most popular forfeits is the person that finishes in last place has to go in their pub golf costume to a public place, such as universities or a place of work.

See also
 List of public house topics

References

Pub crawls
Pub games
Drinking games